Septinus Alua (born 26 September 1989) is an Indonesian professional footballer who plays as a defensive midfielder for Liga 2 club Persiba Balikpapan.

Career

Perseru Serui
In 2016, Septinus joined in the squad of Perseru Serui for 2016 Indonesia Soccer Championship A. Septinus made his debut against Persegres Gresik United in the second week. 
A few minutes before the game ended. Septinus suddenly experiencing pain in his leg after a clash with Persegres Players. When the medical team arrived with a stretcher, Septinus stalling a match time, Finally, Septinus stretchered out of the field. However, he still feels aggrieved, he still protested when he was on a stretcher. Because too many moves, finally, He fell to the ground, and he experienced pain.

Persija Jakarta
On November 27, 2017, he signed a two-year contract with Liga 1 club Persija Jakarta. Alua made his league debut on 12 September 2018 in a match against Borneo at the Segiri Stadium, Samarinda.

PSIS Semarang
He was signed for PSIS Semarang to play in the Liga 1 in the 2019 season. Alua made his league debut on 30 May 2019 in a match against Persebaya Surabaya at the Gelora Bung Tomo Stadium, Surabaya.

Persiba Balikpapan
In 2020, Septinus Alua signed a one-year contract with Indonesian Liga 2 club Persiba Balikpapan.

Honours

Club
Persija Jakarta
 Liga 1: 2018
 Indonesia President's Cup: 2018

References

External links
Septinus Alua

1989 births
Living people
Indonesian footballers
Liga 1 (Indonesia) players
Liga 2 (Indonesia) players
PSIS Semarang players
Persiwa Wamena players
Badak Lampung F.C. players
Perseru Serui players
Persiba Balikpapan players
Persija Jakarta players
People from Wamena
Association football midfielders